Titus Terrasidius was a Roman Knight of the Equestrian order and an officer of the cavalry in Julius Caesar's Legio VII Claudia. He and other officers of the legion were sent out to negotiate provisions for the winter of 56–55 BC; they were captured by Breton tribes who were then subjugated as Caesar describes in his Commentarii de Bello Gallico:

References

Ancient Roman equites
Roman people of the Gallic Wars
Ancient Roman soldiers
1st-century BC Romans